Reflectopallium is a genus of air-breathing land slugs, specifically leaf-veined slugs, terrestrial pulmonate gastropod molluscs in the family Athoracophoridae.

Species
Species within the genus include:
 Reflectopallium delli Burton, 1963
 Reflectopallium marmoratum (Simroth, 1889)
 Reflectopallium papillatum Burton, 1963
 Reflectopallium pseudophyllum Burton, 1963

References

Further reading 
 Barker G. M. (1978). "A reappraisal of Athoracophorus bitentaculatus, with comments on the validity of genus Reflectopallium (Gastropoda: Athoracophoridae)". New Zealand Journal of Zoology 5(2): 281-288.
 Burton D. W. (1963). "New Zealand Land Slugs—Part 2". Tuatara 11(2): 90-96.
 Powell A. W. B. (1979). New Zealand Mollusca, William Collins Publishers Ltd, Auckland, New Zealand, 

Athoracophoridae